The University of the Incarnate Word School of Osteopathic Medicine (UIWSOM) is the medical school of the University of the Incarnate Word, a private Catholic university with its main campus in San Antonio and Alamo Heights, Texas. It was opened in 2015 and holds provisional accreditation with the American Osteopathic Association. 

The school began the inaugural class in summer 2017. Medical graduates of UIW-SOM will receive the Doctor of Osteopathic Medicine (D.O.) degree.

History
UIWSOM opened in 2015, as the second osteopathic medical school in the state of Texas, after the Texas College of Osteopathic Medicine, an academic unit of the University of North Texas Health Science Center in Fort Worth.
UIW-SOM is the site of former President John F. Kennedy's last public speech prior to his assassination in 1963, making building 1 a historical site.

Campus
Formerly the site of the US Air Force School of Aerospace Medicine, and now a registered historic district,  the campus is on the northwest corner of the Brooks City Base.

Academics
UIWSOM confers the Doctor of Osteopathic Medicine medical degree.  In addition, a one-year masters program is offered: Master in Biomedical Sciences program.

The university plans to eventually move its Masters in Nursing and Physical Therapy programs to the Brooks City campus.

See also
 List of medical schools in the United States

References

External links
UIW School of Osteopathic Medicine

Osteopathic medical schools in the United States
Educational institutions established in 2015
Catholic universities and colleges in Texas
Medical schools in Texas
2015 establishments in Texas
University of the Incarnate Word